For Crimin' Out Loud is a 1956 short subject directed by Jules White starring American slapstick comedy team The Three Stooges (Moe Howard, Larry Fine and Shemp Howard). It is the 170th entry in the series released by Columbia Pictures starring the comedians, who released 190 shorts for the studio between 1934 and 1959.

Plot
The Stooges work for Miracle Detective Agency, and are hired by a middle-aged millionaire named John Goodrich (Emil Sitka) to track down some racketeers who have threatened his life. Upon arrival at Old Man Goodrich's mansion, the boys are quickly seduced by a beautiful blonde (Christine McIntyre) who puts a dose of poison in Shemp's drink. Moe and Larry revive Shemp and a spectacular chase ensues, culminating in a lights-out fight, with the Stooges coming out on top.

Cast

Credited
 Moe Howard as Moe
 Larry Fine as Larry
 Shemp Howard as Shemp (final short released with new footage) (of himself)
 Christine McIntyre as Delores (stock footage)
 Emil Sitka as Councilman John Goodrich
 Ralph Dunn as gang leader (stock footage)

Uncredited
 Barbara Bartay as newsgirl
 Charles Knight as Crandall (stock footage)
 Duke York as Nikko (stock footage)

Production notes
For Crimin' Out Loud is a reworking of 1949's Who Done It? (itself a remake of the Schilling and Lane short Pardon My Terror) using ample stock footage from the original film. The first five minutes consist of new footage filmed on June 30, 1955. The remainder of the film (save one closeup of the Stooges after Shemp is poisoned) is made up of stock footage. The title is a play on the expression, "For crying out loud!"

For Crimin' Out Loud is the last film released to contain new footage of Shemp Howard. However, it was not the last one filmed. For Crimin' Out Loud was filmed on June 30, 1955: the previous release, Flagpole Jitters, was actually filmed the next day on July 1 but the first of the two films to be released. Shemp died of a sudden heart attack on November 22, 1955, before any new films were produced.

See also
List of American films of 1956

References

External links
 
 
For Crimin' Out Loud at threestooges.net

1956 films
Columbia Pictures short films
1956 comedy films
American black-and-white films
Films directed by Jules White
The Three Stooges film remakes
The Three Stooges films
1950s English-language films
1950s American films
American comedy short films